Uchenna Martin Anyanwu (born August 30, 1979) in New York City, known professionally as Uch or DJ Uch is an American radio presenter, mixshow DJ, and house music producer who grew up in The Bronx, New York.

Career in radio

Uch began his dj career through radio, and has interviewed many artists in dance music including Matthew Dear, Chus & Ceballos, Annet Artani, The Riddler, Lucas Prata, Kaskade and David Guetta. He was a host of the Pump It Up Radio program on Harlem's WHCR-FM and a mixshow dj for Long Island's WPTY.

Musical career

Uch began producing music in 2008 and has remixed for Lori Michaels and Oba Frank Lords amongst other artists. He currently produces on Todd Terry's InHouse Records amongst other house record labels. In 2011, he released the Imo State EP, an original composition for the Giuseppe D led label Monitor Sound Recordings, and in 2013, Uch began using Imo State as an alias for his underground productions.

Discography

Singles:

 2020: Genius of House
 2019: Champion Sound (with Mike Ivy)
 2018: Hey Baby
 2018: Ketty White (with Ooomeeey)
 2018: 5 for 20 (with Ooomeeey)
 2018: Off the Rails (with Ooomeeey)
 2018: Mushroom Hill (with Ooomeeey)
 2017: XTC in Germany
 2017: San Francisco Treat
 2017: So What (feat. Larisa)
 2017: Freak It
 2017: Take My Hand (feat. Violetta Vee)
 2016: With Love
 2016: Duck Down
 2016: I Need
 2016: Music For Me
 2016: Shady (feat. Angelica De No)
 2016: Love 4 Life
 2016: Drunk in DC10
 2016: Ibiza Nights
 2016: Reade Street
 2015: Frente Del Mar (with Anderson)
 2015: Perception (with Alexander J)
 2015: Sadie (Remix EP)
 2015: Phuket Bounce
 2015: Give It 2 Me (feat. Yana & Imo State)
 2015: Really Good
 2014: Sadie
 2014: "Let Me Know" (feat. Larisa)
 2014: "Amor Ibiza: The Remix"
 2014: "Open Book: The Remix" (with DJ Giovanni, Billy Brown, & GinaMarie Z)
 2013: "Open Book" (with DJ Giovanni, Billy Brown, & GinaMarie Z)
 2013: "Tell Me"
 2012: "Limelight (Party With U Baby)" (feat. Vice Verse)
 2012: "Move My Body" (feat. Via Melissa)
 2012: "Amor Ibiza" (feat. Tess)

Remixes:

 2017: "Goosebumps (DJ Uch Remix)" - Travis Scott
 2017: "Mask Off (DJ Uch Remix)" - Future
 2017: "Hurt Bae" - DJ UCH
 2017: "Catch Me Outside" - DJ UCH
 2016: "We Don't Talk Anymore (DJ Uch Remix)" - Charlie Puth & Selena Gomez  (#FORTHEFANS Series)
 2016: "You're A DJ (Uch Remix)" - The Wannabees (#FORTHEFANS Series)
 2016: "Freak Like Me (DJ Uch Remix)" - DJ Deeon, Lee Walker (#FORTHEFANS Series)
 2016: "This Girl (DJ Uch Remix)" - Kungs, Cookin' on 3 Burners (#FORTHEFANS Series)
 2016: "9PM (DJ Uch Remix)" - ATB (#FORTHEFANS Series)
 2016: "March Madness (DJ Uch Remix)" - Future (#FORTHEFANS Series) 
 2016: "Who's That Girl (Dj Uch Remix)" - Eve (#FORTHEFANS Series)
 2016: "All The Way Up (DJ Uch Remix)" - Fat Joe, Remy Ma, French Montana (#FORTHEFANS Series)
 2016: "Welcome To Jam Rock (DJ Uch Remix)" - Damian Marley (#FORTHEFANS Series) 
 2015: "Nova27" - Retro Jay [Nova27 Records]
 2014: "Crazy For You" - Sam Dungate & Imo State
 2013: "Crank Up The Music" - Izzy Rock feat. Hondo Vega
 2013: "This Is Cielo" - MDW
 2012: "Stalker" - Sugur Shane
 2012: "Bump" - King Ralphy
 2011: "Dale" - Chris Costanzo feat. Michael M
 2011: "Ibiza" - Giorgio
 2011: "Electro Bump" - MDW
 2011: "Rumble" - Oba Frank Lords
 2010: "Rebound" - Lori Michaels

Mixtapes:

 2014: Is This Love?
 2014: #UCHMusic 01

Productions as Imo State:

 2016: Body 2 Body [Nova27 Records]
 2016: Clap Back [Nova27 Records]
 2015: Sadie (Remix EP)
 2015: Give It 2 Me (with Yana & Uch)
 2015: Winter Remix EP (with Retro Jay and Uch)
 2014: Sam Dungate & Imo State - Crazy For You
 2014: Izzy Rock - Bang Bang The Drums (Imo State Remix)
 2014: Winter Darling, John Spinosa, DJ Amoroso - Dark Kiss (Imo State Remix) [Nova27 Records]
 2013: Imo State - RIhanna's Baby [Nova27 Records]

See also
Lenny Fontana, American house music DJ from New York City

References

External links
 http://www.mtv.com/news/articles/1657803/lady-gaga-born-this-way-madonna.jhtml
 https://www.nme.com/nme-video/youtube/id/ka_ah3eYzA0/search/audionmatthew-dear
 https://web.archive.org/web/20120413005255/http://whcr.org/SHOW_PROFILE/pump_it_up_radio.html

1979 births
African-American DJs
Electronic dance music DJs
American radio personalities
Living people
Musicians from New York City
21st-century African-American people
20th-century African-American people